The Hôtel Prouvost is a historic hôtel particulier in Roubaix, France. It was built in 1878 for Charles Prouvost-Scrépel. It has been listed as an official historical monument since 1998.

References

Roubaix
Prouvost
Houses completed in 1878
Monuments historiques of Nord (French department)